Stefan Hickl (born 11 April 1988 in Frankfurt am Main) is a German footballer who plays for SG Ober-Erlenbach. He played in the 2. Bundesliga for FSV Frankfurt.

References

External links
 

1988 births
Living people
German footballers
SV Viktoria Preußen 07 players
FSV Frankfurt players
SV Darmstadt 98 players
Kickers Offenbach players
FC Viktoria Köln players
2. Bundesliga players
3. Liga players
Association football defenders
Footballers from Frankfurt